Bulthaupt may refer to::

 Axel Bulthaupt (1966-), German entertainer
 Heinrich Bulthaupt, (1849-1905), German poet, dramatic author, and lawyer,